The Wedell-Williams Model 45 was a racing aircraft built in the United States in 1933.

Design and development
The Model 45 was a development of designer James Wedell's earlier Model 44 and was a low-wing cantilever monoplane with tailwheel undercarriage, the main units of which were retractable.

Operational history
The Model 45 flew for the first time on June 28, 1933 and showed promising performance achieving an average speed of 264.703 mph on a 100 km closed course.

Wedell-Williams pilot, John Worthen flew the 45 to a second place in the 1934 Bendix Trophy race and if not for a navigation error would have demolished the 44's first place time by at least 50 minutes.

On June 24, 1934, Jimmy Wedell died in an accident while piloting a Gypsy Moth on a flying lesson. Development of the 45 was delayed following the loss of its creator. Even so, the 45 was entered in the 1934 Thompson Trophy Race. In a preliminary event, the Shell Speed Dash Unlimited, Worthen placed first with an average speed of 302.13 mph. He then qualified the 45 with a speed of 292.14 mph, third behind the 44 and Turner's racer in the main event. However the 45 was still suffering from development problems and was withdrawn due to instability.

During the Thompson race Doug Davis crashed the 44 and was killed instantly. Devastated, the Wedell-Williams team dismantled and trucked the 45 to Patterson. It never flew again.

In rapid succession, the remaining Wedell-Williams principals were killed in air crashes: Walter Wedell, Jimmy's brother, was killed in a crash on July 18, 1935. Company co-founder Harry Palmerston Williams and chief test pilot, John Worthen were both killed on May 19, 1936 in a crash.

After the death of Williams, the Model 45 was donated to Louisiana State University, where it  eventually disappeared, its final fate unknown.

A full-scale replica Model 45, constructed by Jim B. Clevenger of Kissimmee, Florida, is on display at the Louisiana State Museum in Patterson, Louisiana.

Specifications (Model 45)

See also

References
Notes

Bibliography

 Foxworth, Thomas G. The Speed Seekers. New York: Doubleday, 1976. .
 Hirsch, Robert S. and Barbara H. Schultz. Wedell-Williams Air Service. Lancaster, California: Little Buttes Publishing, 2001. .
 Schmid, Sylvester H. and Truman C. Weaver. The Golden Age of Air Racing: 1927–1933. Oshkosh, Wisconsin: EAA Aviation Foundation, 1983. .

External links

 Photos of the Model 45, Louisiana State Museum

1930s United States sport aircraft
Low-wing aircraft
Single-engined tractor aircraft
Aircraft first flown in 1933
Model 45